Akuna Bay is an urban place in Sydney, Australia.

Akuna Bay sits in the Ku-ring-gai Chase National Park and takes its name from the bay on Coal and Candle Creek. It can be accessed by a marina on the bay or by Liberator General San Martin Drive.

History
Akuna was thought to be an Aboriginal word meaning to follow. It actually is a mangled version of the Dieri word ngaka-rna meaning "to flow" from South Australia.

In 1972 the construction of a marina was proposed and it was completed in 1974.

References

Sydney localities